The group all-around competition for rhythmic gymnastics at the 2019 Southeast Asian Games in Philippines was held on 7 December 2019 at Rizal Memorial Coliseum.

Results

References

Rhythmic group all-around